The 2016–17 Lebanese Women's Football League was the 10th edition of the Lebanese Women's Football League since its inception in 2008. Two-time defending champions SAS won their third title.

League table

See also
2016–17 Lebanese Women's FA Cup

References

External links
RSSSF.com

Lebanese Women's Football League seasons
W1
2016–17 domestic women's association football leagues